Veaceslav Rogac (born 30 March 1971) is a Moldovan professional football manager and former footballer. Since June 2015 he is the head coach of Moldavian football club FC Zaria Bălți.

References

External links
 Veaceslav Rogac at soccerway (as manager)

1971 births
Living people
Sportspeople from Chișinău
Moldovan football managers
CSF Bălți managers
Moldovan Super Liga managers